Jewell Hicks was an architect in Oklahoma.  He practiced on his own and at some point was a partner in Layton Hicks & Forsyth.

He designed a few courthouses in Oklahoma.

Several of his works are listed on the National Register of Historic Places.

Works include:
Barnes-Steverson House, 3 Adams St., SE, Idabel, Oklahoma, NRHP-listed
Bryan County Courthouse (Durant, Oklahoma), NRHP-listed
Garvin County Courthouse, Courthouse Sq. and Grant Ave., Pauls Valley, Oklahoma, NRHP-listed 
Marshall County Courthouse (Madill, Oklahoma), Courthouse Sq., Madill, Oklahoma, NRHP-listed
Murray County Courthouse (1923), Wyandotte Ave., Sulphur, Oklahoma, NRHP-listed
One or more works in Historic Downtown Sulphur Commercial District, West Muskogee St., from W 1st St. to W 5th St., and W 5th. Sulphur, Oklahoma, NRHP-listed

References

Architects from Oklahoma
20th-century American architects
Year of birth missing
Year of death missing